Woltersdorf may refer to the following places in Germany:

Woltersdorf, Brandenburg, in the Oder-Spree district, Brandenburg
Woltersdorf, Lower Saxony, in the Lüchow-Dannenberg district, Lower Saxony
Woltersdorf, Schleswig-Holstein, in the Lauenburg district, Schleswig-Holstein
Woltersdorf, Saxony-Anhalt, in the Jerichower Land district, Saxony-Anhalt
Woltersdorf (Fläming), a part of Nuthe-Urstromtal, in the Teltow-Fläming district, Brandenburg